Zoia is both a given name and a surname. Notable people with the name include:

Given name
Zoia Ceaușescu (1949–2006), Romanian mathematician
Zoia Duriagina (born 1950), Ukrainian scientist 
Zoia Gaidai (1902–1965), Soviet Ukrainian opera soprano
Zoia Horn (1918–2014), American librarian
Zoia Korvin-Krukovsky (1903–1999), Russian-Swedish artist
Zoia Ovsii (born 1994), Ukrainian Paralympic athlete
Zoia Skoropadenko (born 1978), Ukrainian contemporary mixed-media artist

Surname
Clyde Zoia (1896–1955), American football player
Luigi Zoia (born 1948), Italian karateka